The 1997 World Weightlifting Championships were held in Chiang Mai, Thailand from December 6 to December 14. The men's competition in the 99 kg division was staged on 13 December 1997.

Medalists

Records

Results

References
Weightlifting World Championships Seniors Statistics, Page 10 
Results

1997 World Weightlifting Championships